Mirel Cană (1957-2020) was a Romanian novelist, who wrote under the name Șerban Alexandru.

Life
Mirel Cană studied philology at Iași University, and taught Romanian literature from 1982 to 1990. He was an editor at Editura Junimea in Iași from 1990 to 1992, and then a curator at the National Museum of Romanian Literature in Iași. In the decades following the Romanian Revolution, he also ran writers’ workshops in Iași.

His novels Mallarmé, Albedo and An Angel, a Dog, an Image form the first three volumes of a tetralogy, Benedict and Maledict. The fragmented, 'kaleidoscopic' style of An Angel, a Dog, an Image has been compared to the work of Camilo José Cela.

Works
 (as Șerban Alexandru) Zgomotul de fond: roman [Background Noise: a novel]. Iaşi: Junimea, 1992.
 (as Șerban Alexandru) Mallarmé. 1995. Forthcoming in English translation by Alistair Ian Blyth as Mallarmé, Dalkey Archive Press, 2021. 
 Albedo. 1995.
 (as Șerban Alexandru) Omul e mort: noua poema română [Man Is Dead: a new Romanian poem]. Iaşi: Junimea, 2001.
 (as Mirel Cană) Diagnostic [Diagnosis]. Bucharest: Humanitas, 2010. With a foreword by Ioanel C. Sinescu.
 Un înger, un cîine, o imagine: roman [An Angel, a Dog, an Image: a novel]. Iași: Polirom, 2015.

References

1957 births
2020 deaths
Romanian novelists
Writers from Iași
Alexandru Ioan Cuza University alumni